Dara Academy, is a private coeducational Christian school in Chiang Mai, Thailand.  It currently serves 6,000 students from pre-kindergarten to grade 12.

History
Dara Academy was founded in 1878 by Presbyterian missionaries Rev. Dr. Daniel McGilvary and Sophie McGilvery.  Originally established as an all-girls school, it was intended to equal the education available to boys from monks at Buddhist temples.  The school was originally called “Phra Racha Chaya Girls School” after Phra Racha Chaya Chao Dara Rasmi, and was simplified to Dara Academy in 1923.  The school is led by the Church of Christ in Thailand.

Royal visits
 1925: His Majesty King Prajadhipok (Rama VII,  Phra Pokklao Chaoyuhua) and Queen Ramphaiphanni
 1949: Queen Ramphaiphanni (Somdej Phra Nangchao Ramphaiphanni Phra Boromarajininat - สมเด็จพระนางเจ้ารำไพพรรณี พระบรมราชินี)
 1958: His Majesty the King, Bhumibol Adulyadej

Native-Speaker Program
Dara employs over 37 native speakers for its foreign language program (called NP), teaching English, Chinese, Japanese and Korean.

Dara Academy's English NP is a specialized English language course.  Classes are taught by Native English speakers four or five times a week.  The program is offered to all students from pre-kindergarten to grade 12.

Classes sizes are kept under 35 students (compared to regular class sizes that contain up to 55 students).  Students learn in air-conditioned rooms which are equipped with modern technology including audio / video, smart T.V.s, and computers, depending on grade level. 

Teachers focus on speaking, listening, reading and writing skills.  Students participate in field trips, English Camps, NP Fair and school play, and annual newspaper, The Dara Star.

Address
196 Kaewnawarat Rd, T. Wat Ket, A. Muang, Chiang Mai 50000 Thailand

Address (Thai language): 196 ถ.แก้วนวรัฐ ต.วัดเกต อ.เมือง จ.เชียงใหม่. 50000

See also
Education in Thailand
Princes Royal's College, sister school
Church of Christ in Thailand

External links
Dara Academy
Dara Academy Native Speaker Program

Christian schools in Thailand
Schools in Chiang Mai
Presbyterian schools in Asia
Educational institutions established in 1878
1878 establishments in Siam